Stilbus testaceus is a species of beetles commonly called the shining flower beetles belonging to the family Phalacridae.

Distribution
This rather common species is present in most of Europe and in the Afrotropical realm.

Habitat

These beetles can be found in meadows and forest edges, on flowers, on dry grass and hay, in moss and dead leaves.

Description
These tiny beetles have a spherical-oval brownish body, with a yellowish- reddish apex of the elitra. Head and pronotum are dark. The hind angles of the pronotum are sharp, right-angled.

Biology
Adults can be found from May to October on flowering grasses, while in Winter they rest under fallen leaves and among the mosses.

References

External links
 Eakringbirds
 Natura Mediterraneo

Phalacridae